Oracle Fusion Middleware (FMW, also known as Fusion Middleware) consists of several software products from Oracle Corporation. FMW spans multiple services, including Java EE and developer tools, integration services, business intelligence, collaboration, and content management. FMW depends on open standards such as BPEL, SOAP, XML and JMS.

Oracle Fusion Middleware provides software for the development, deployment, and management of service-oriented architecture (SOA). It includes what Oracle calls "hot-pluggable" architecture,
designed to facilitate integration with existing applications and systems from other software vendors such as IBM, Microsoft, and SAP AG.

Evolution 
Many of the products included under the FMW banner do not themselves qualify as middleware products: "Fusion Middleware" essentially represents a re-branding of many of Oracle products outside of Oracle's core database and applications-software offerings—compare Oracle Fusion.

Oracle acquired many of its FMW products via acquisitions. This includes products from BEA Systems and Stellent.

In order to provide standards-based software to assist with business process automation, HP has incorporated FMW into its "service-oriented architecture (SOA) portfolio".

Oracle leveraged its Configurable Network Computing (CNC) technology acquired from its PeopleSoft/JD Edwards 2005 purchase.

Oracle Fusion Applications, based on Oracle Fusion Middleware, were finally released in September 2010.

According to Oracle, as of 2013, over 120,000 customers were using Fusion Middleware. This includes over 35 of the world's 50 largest companies and more than 750 of the BusinessWeek Global 1000, with FMW also supported by 7,500 partners.

Assessments 
In January 2008, Oracle WebCenter Content (formerly Universal Content Management) won InfoWorld's "Technology of the Year" award for "Best Enterprise Content Manager", with Oracle SOA Suite winning the award for "Best Enterprise Service Bus".

In 2007, Gartner wrote that "Oracle Fusion Middleware has reached a degree of completeness that puts it on par with, and in some cases ahead of, competing software stacks", and reported revenue from the suite of over US$1 billion during FY06, estimating the revenue from the genuinely middleware aspects at US$740 million.

Oracle Fusion Middleware components 
 Infrastructure / Application server
 Oracle WebLogic Server (WLS)
 Oracle Application Server (IAS)
 JRockit – a JVM whose functionality has now been merged to OpenJDK
 Tuxedo (software)
 Oracle Coherence
 Oracle Service Registry – metadata registry
 application-server security
 Oracle Web Cache
 Integration and process-management
 BPEL Process Manager
 Oracle Business Activity Monitoring (Oracle BAM) – Business activity monitoring (BAM)
 business rules
 Business Process Analysis Suite
 Oracle BPM – Business process management
 Oracle Data Integrator (ODI) – an application using the database for set-based data integration
 Enterprise connectivity (adapters)
 Oracle Enterprise Messaging Service
 Oracle Enterprise Service Bus
 Oracle Application server B2B
 Oracle Web Services Manager (OWSM) - a security and monitoring product for web services
 Application development tools
 Oracle Application Development Framework (ADF)
 JDeveloper
 Oracle SOA Suite
 TopLink – a Java object-relational mapping package
 Oracle Forms services
 Oracle Developer Suite
 Business intelligence
 Oracle Business Intelligence (OBIEE)
 Oracle Crystal Ball – enables stochastic forecasting and simulation using spreadsheet models
 Oracle Discoverer
 Data hubs
 Oracle BI Publisher
 Oracle Reports services
 Systems management
 Oracle Enterprise Manager
 Web services manager
 User interaction / content management
 Oracle Beehive – collaboration platform
 Unified messaging
 Workspaces
 Oracle WebCenter
 Oracle Imaging and Process Management
 Web content management
 Records management
 Enterprise search
 Digital asset management
 Email archiving
 Identity management
 Oracle Identity Management
 Enterprise Single sign-on
 Oracle Entitlements Server
 Oracle Identity Manager
 Oracle Access Manager
 Oracle Adaptive Access Manager
 Oracle Virtual Directory

See also
 BEA Systems
 Oracle Fusion Applications
 Oracle Technology Network (OTN)
 Stellent

References

External links
 Oracle Fusion Middleware overview
 KMWorld article on Oracle acquisition of Stellent
 Stellent acquisition page
 WebCenter Content Users Group - Yahoo! Groups
 OTN Forum - WebCenter Content
 Fujitsu.com-42 Real Life Examples of Fusion Middleware with Applications
 Amazon.com Oracle Fusion Middleware Patterns - Harish Gaur (Author), Markus Zirn (Contributor)
 Content.FM Content Management On Air. Broadcasting news, product updates and general purpose information about ECM and Oracle Universal Content Management

Fusion
Middleware
Service-oriented architecture-related products